RBL Bank, formerly known as Ratnakar Bank, is an Indian private sector bank headquartered in Mumbai and founded in 1943. It offers services across six verticals: corporate and institutional banking, commercial banking, branch and business banking, retail assets, development banking and financial inclusion, treasury and financial market operations.

History 
On 6 August 1943, Ratnakar Bank was founded as a regional bank in Maharashtra with two branches in Kolhapur and Sangli founded by Babgonda Bhujgonda Patil from Sangli and Gangappa Siddappa Chougule from Kolhapur. It mainly served small and medium enterprises (SMEs) and business merchants in the Kolhapur-Sangli belt. It was incorporated in Kolhapur district on 14 June 1943 as Ratnakar Bank Limited. In 1959, the bank was categorized as a scheduled commercial bank as per the Reserve Bank of India Act, 1934. During this decade, it was referred to as an NH4 Bank. In 1970, it received a banking license from the Reserve Bank of India (RBI).

In July 2010, Vishwavir Ahuja became managing director and CEO of the bank. In August 2014, the name of the bank was changed to RBL Bank Limited.

Operations

As of March 2022, it has a network of 502 branches and 414 ATMs across 28 states and union territories. It has 9,257 employees.The Bank also has a network of 1418 business correspondent branches of which 870 business correspondent branches are managed by RBL Finserve Limited, a wholly owned business correspondent of the Bank.

In 2016, the bank ran a financial literacy programme called Saksham in collaboration with CDC to provide education to 25,000 individuals and 300 villages in four districts of Madhya Pradesh. Another Saksham programme was run in Ahmedabad in 2013.

In 2018, RBL Bank partnered with MoneyTap to launch India's first personal credit line based app. The same year in June, the company announced that it had raised its stake in microlender Swadhaar FinServe to 100 per cent.

Funding
The Bank has raised Rs. 8,600 crore of equity capital and Rs. 1500 crore of Basel III compliant Tier II debt from 2010 to date. The Bank counts Barings Private Equity Asia, British International Investment (formerly CDC Group), Multiples Alternate Asset Management, Asian Development Bank, HDFC.Ltd, ICICI prudential Life Insurance, Gaja Capital among others as its shareholders.

Throughout the 2010s, RBL Bank reportedly raised a total of INR 4,000 crore from investors. It raised INR 700 crore in 2011, INR 376 crore in 2013, INR 328 crore in 2014 and INR 488 crore in 2016. In July 2017, RBL Bank received board approval to raise an additional INR 1680 crore.

In December 2019, the company announced that it had raised INR 675 crore through preferential issue. Investors such as East Bridge Capital Master Fund and WF Asian Reconnaissance Fund participated.

In August 2020, the company announced that it has raised INR 1566 crore through preferential issue. It was led by Baring Private Equity Asia where as other investors included ICICI Prudential Life, CDC Group and local private equity company Gaja Capital.

Management rejig 
The search committee constituted to identify the MD & CEO for the Bank ran an exhaustive process along 
with Egon Zehnder and recommended the name of Mr.R Subramaniakumar, a highly capable and a 
meritorious person for the job.

Awards and recognition
Best Bank for Digital solutions - Asiamoney Best Bank Awards 2022 by Euromoney
Best Bank for Microfinance - Asiamoney Best Bank Awards 2019 by Euromoney
Best Small Bank, Business Today – Money Today Financial Awards 2019
Best Self Service Banking Initiative, Application - The Asian Banker Financial Technology Innovation Awards by The Asian Banker

See also

 Banking in India
 List of banks in India
 Reserve Bank of India
 Indian Financial System Code
 List of largest banks
 List of companies of India
 Make in India

References

External links
 

Private sector banks in India
Banks based in Mumbai
Financial services companies based in Mumbai
Banks established in 1943
Indian brands
Indian companies established in 1943
Companies listed on the National Stock Exchange of India
Companies listed on the Bombay Stock Exchange